Edinburgh Printmakers is a printmaking studio and gallery in Edinburgh, Scotland. It has played a key role in the careers of Alan Davie, John Bellany, Carol Rhodes and Kate Downie.

History 

Edinburgh Printmakers was established in 1967, Britain's first open access printmaking studio   promoting wider participation in the arts.

In 2019 the Printmakers moved from its former home on Union Street to Castle Mills, Dundee Street in Fountainbridge, a building which was once the headquarters for the North British Rubber Company. They opened with exhibitions by German printmaker  and Scottish artist Callum Innes. Janet Archer was appointed CEO in 2021

The building at Castle Mills won architecture awards for re-use and social impact.  The organisation is successful in winning subsidies and investment in order to ensure that creative art spaces are open to the public.  It is now offers access print studio printmaking facilities  for artists using traditional and digital processes. The facilities include dedicated learning space, art galleries, a shop, café and print archive.

In 2020 the Printmakers showed the work of Adebusola Ramsay as part of the Scottish Black Lives Matter Mural Trail.

References 

Scottish printmakers
Edinburgh